Paranthidium is a genus of bees in the family Megachilidae.

Species
 Paranthidium flavolineatum (Smith, 1879)
 Paranthidium gabbii (Cresson, 1878)
 Paranthidium impatiens (Smith, 1879)
 Paranthidium jugatorium (Say, 1824)
 Paranthidium orizabae (Dalla Torre, 1890)
 Paranthidium vespoides (Friese, 1925)

References

External links

 

Megachilidae
Bee genera
Articles created by Qbugbot